Imenje is a settlement in the Municipality of Moravče in central Slovenia. It lies on the road from Moravče to Prevoje. The area is part of the traditional region of Upper Carniola. It is now included with the rest of the municipality in the Central Slovenia Statistical Region.

Name
Imenje was attested in historical sources as Meny in 1458.

References

External links

Imenje on Geopedia

Populated places in the Municipality of Moravče